Small Heath is an area in Birmingham, England. It may also refer to:

Organizations
Birmingham Small Heath (UK Parliament constituency), a Parliament constituency centred on the Small Heath area of Birmingham
Small Heath or Small Heath Alliance, former names of the Birmingham City F.C.

Other uses
Small heath (butterfly) (Coenonympha pamphilus)